Carinapex amirowlandae is a species of sea snail, a marine gastropod mollusk in the family Horaiclavidae.

Description
The length of the shell attains 3.1 mm.

Distribution
This marine species occurs off Madagascar, the Philippines and in the Central Pacific.

References

 Wiedrick S.G. (2015). Review of the genus Carinapex Dall, 1924 with the description of ten new species (Gastropoda: Conoidea: Horaiclavidae) from the Pacific Ocean. The Festivus. 47(1): 5–28. page(s): 6, pl. 1 figs 9-12

External links
 

amirowlandae